The Statute Law Revision Programme is a project of the Law Reform Commission responsible for the preparation of Statute law revision Bills in Ireland.

The Programme, previously known as the Statute law revision project, operated in the office of the Attorney General from 2003 to 2012 and in the Department of Public Expenditure and Reform from 2012 to 2016. Its operation was taken over by the Law Reform Commission in 2020. The great majority of the legislation repealed have been acts passed by the Parliament of the United Kingdom and its predecessors.

While introducing the most recent measure in 2016, Minister Damien English stated that "To date, over 60,000 items of legislation have been either expressly or implicitly repealed under the programme. This Bill, when enacted, together with the five previous Statute Law Revision Acts, will collectively be the most extensive set of repealing measures in the history of the State and the most extensive set of statute law revision measures ever enacted anywhere in the world."

The legislation taken as a whole has comprehensively reviewed primary legislation up to 1950 and secondary legislation up to 1820.

Legislation enacted
To date six pieces of legislation have been prepared under the Programme and its predecessor initiatives:

 Statute Law Revision (Pre-1922) Act 2005
 Statute Law Revision Act 2007
 Statute Law Revision Act 2009
 Statute Law Revision Act 2012
 Statute Law Revision Act 2015
 Statute Law Revision Act 2016

Areas yet to be reviewed
By 2022, the programme to date is expected to complete review of the following areas of legislative material:
 Secondary legislation 1821 to date
 Primary legislation 1951 to date
 Charters and letters patent 1066 to date

References

External links
Statute Law Revision Programme at Law Reform Commission website

Department of Public Expenditure, National Development Plan Delivery and Reform
Programme